André Franquin (3 January 1924 – 5 January 1997) was an influential Belgian comics artist, whose best-known creations are Gaston and Marsupilami. He also produced the Spirou et Fantasio comic strip from 1946 to 1968, a period seen by many as the series' golden age.

Biography

Franquin's beginnings

Franquin was born in Etterbeek in 1924. Although he started drawing at an early age, Franquin got his first actual drawing lessons at École Saint-Luc in 1943. A year later however, the school was forced to close down because of the war and Franquin was then hired by Compagnie belge d'actualités (CBA), a short-lived animation studio in Brussels. It is there he met some of his future colleagues: Maurice de Bevere (Morris, creator of Lucky Luke), Pierre Culliford (Peyo, creator of the Smurfs), and Eddy Paape. Three of them (minus Peyo) were hired by Dupuis in 1945, following CBA's demise. Peyo, still too young, would only follow them seven years later. Franquin started drawing covers and cartoons for Le Moustique, a weekly magazine about radio and culture. He also worked for Plein Jeu, a monthly scouting magazine.

During this time, Morris and Franquin were coached by Joseph Gillain (Jijé), who had transformed a section of his house into a work space for the two young comics artists and Will. Jijé was then producing many of the comics that were published in the Franco-Belgian comics magazine Spirou, including its flagship series Spirou et Fantasio. The team he had assembled at the end of the war is often referred to as La bande des quatre (lit. "The Gang of Four"), and the graphical style they would develop together was later called the Marcinelle school, Marcinelle being an outskirt of the industrial city of Charleroi south of Brussels where Spirou's publisher Dupuis was then situated.

Jijé passed the Spirou et Fantasio strip to Franquin, five pages into the making of Spirou et la maison préfabriquée, and from Spirou issue #427 released 20 June 1946, the young Franquin held creative responsibility of the series. For the next twenty years, Franquin largely reinvented the strip, creating longer, more elaborate storylines and a large gallery of burlesque characters.

Most notable among these is the Marsupilami, a fictional monkey-like creature. The inspiration for the Marsupilami's extremely long, prehensile tail came from imagining an appendage for the busy tramway conductors Franquin and his colleagues often encountered on their way to work. This animal has become part of Belgian and French popular culture, and has spawned cartoons, merchandise, and since 1989 a comic book series of its own. The cartoons have broadened its appeal to English-speaking countries.

Mid period
By 1951, Franquin had found his style. His strip, which appeared every week on the first page of Spirou, was a hit. Following Jijé's lead in the 1940s, Franquin coached a younger generation of comics artists in the 1950s, notably Jean Roba and Jidéhem, who both worked with him on Spirou et Fantasio.

In 1955, following a contractual dispute with his publisher Dupuis, Franquin went for a short stint at rival Tintin magazine. This led to the creation of Modeste et Pompon, a gag series which included contributions from René Goscinny (of Astérix fame) and Peyo. Franquin later returned to Spirou, but his contractual commitment to Tintin meant that he had to contribute to both magazines, an unusual arrangement in the comic industry. The series was later passed on to authors such as Dino Attanasio and Mittéï (Jean Mariette).

In 1957, Spirou chief editor Yvan Delporte gave Franquin the idea for a new figure, Gaston Lagaffe (from the French la gaffe, meaning "the blunder"). Initially a joke designed to fill up blank space in the magazine, the weekly strip, detailing the mishaps and madcap ideas and inventions of a terminally idle office boy working at the Spirou offices, took off and became one of Franquin's best-known creations.

However, Franquin soon suffered a period of depression, which forced him to stop drawing Spirou for a time. This happened between 1961 and 1963, in the middle of QRN sur Bretzelburg. During this time, he continued to draw Gaston despite ill health, most likely because of the lighter nature of the series. (In one story, Bravo Les Brothers, Gaston's antics drive his boss Fantasio to yet another nervous breakdown. In desperation he takes some anti-depressants which "Franquin left behind".)

In 1967, Franquin passed Spirou et Fantasio on to a younger artist, Jean-Claude Fournier, and began to work full-time on his own creations.

Gaston gradually evolved from pure slapstick humor to feature themes important to Franquin, such as pacifism and environmentalism. Franquin also used its characters in paid ad strips he drew, and worked with the strip on and off until his death.

Franquin's later period
The 1960s saw a clear evolution in Franquin's style, which grew more loose and intricate. This graphical evolution would continue throughout the next decade. Soon, Franquin was considered an undisputed master of the art form, on par with the likes of Hergé and his influence can be seen in the work of nearly every cartoonist hired by Spirou up until the end of the 1990s. Early comic fanzines from around 1970 featured Franquin's Monsters, individual drawings of imaginary beasts highlighting his graphical craftmanship.

The last, and most radical, shift in Franquin's production happened in 1977, when he went through another nervous breakdown and began his Idées Noires strip (lit. "Dark Thoughts"), first for the Spirou supplement, Le Trombone Illustré (with other cartoonists like René Follet) and later for Fluide Glacial. With Idées Noires, Franquin showed the darker, pessimistic side of his nature. In one strip, a pair of flies are seen wandering through a strange landscape, discussing the mistakes of their predecessors. In the final panel, we see the landscape is a city made from human skulls, and one fly responds: "Don't be too hard on them, they did leave us such splendid cities". Drawn entirely in black and white, Idées Noires is much more adult-oriented than Franquin's other works, focusing on themes such as death, war, pollution and capital punishment with a devastatingly sarcastic sense of humour.

From 1978 to 1986, he was part of the team that developed the concept of Isabelle, the adventures of a little girl in a world of witches and monsters. The character was named after Franquin's daughter.

Proof of his popular and critical appeal, Franquin was awarded the very first Grand Prix de la ville d'Angoulême in 1974. Many books by Franquin have been published, many of which are considered classics of the genre. They have been translated in many languages. Several books have been written about Franquin, such as Numa Sadoul's Et Franquin créa la gaffe, an exhaustive interview with the artist covering his entire career.

Franquin died in 1997 in Saint-Laurent-du-Var at the age of 73 from a heart attack. He was previously married to Liliane Servais. In 2004 took place the first major museum retrospective of his work, an exhibit called "Le monde de Franquin"', in Paris' Cité des Sciences et de l'Industrie.  This exhibition was continued in 2006 in the city where he was born, Brussels, the latter was fully bilingual (French/Dutch). In 2005, a Walloon survey elected him as the "18th greatest Belgian ever".

Influence

Franquin's style rests in opposite corners of the aesthetic spectrum from Hergé: If the pictures of Tintin's creator were characterized by the use of ligne claire, flat colors and a certain staticism, Franquin's graphic approach progressively evolved towards a multi-color aesthetics, chiaroscuro and a vigorous sense of movement. Hergé expressed in several occasions his admiration for Franquin's work: "Compared to him, I’m but a poor draftsman".

Franquin was a prominent member of the first generation of the “Marcinelle School” (École de Marcinelle), also formed by Morris and Will, who would be joined during the 50s by the second generation including, among others, Peyo, Tillieux, and two subsequent generations joining during the 60s and 70-80s. Within this group, Franquin's influence was uncontested, especially among the authors that continued the series Spirou et Fantasio after he left. Jean-Claude Fournier, Nic Broca and especially Janry (Jean-Richard Geurts) showed in this series graphic styles that tried to mimic with varying degrees of success the features of Franquin's style.

Other Franco-Belgian authors that show Franquin's influence were Dino Attanasio and Mittéï (Jean Mariette), both responsible for the series Modeste et Pompon after he left, Jidéhem (Jean De Mesmaeker), a usual collaborator of Franquin for Spirou et Fantasio and Gaston Lagaffe, Batem (Luc Collin), artist of the Marsupilami series, or Pierre Seron, who cloned Franquin's style in his series Les Petits Hommes.

A most remarkable case is Franquin's influence in Francisco Ibáñez, possibly the most widely published Spanish author since the 1950s. Starting in the 1970s, Ibáñez made an extensive use of ideas and designs from Franquin's works, adapting them to his own universe, but also importing many graphic and narrative solutions. Even one of his characters, "El Botones Sacarino", can be easily identified as a hybrid of Spirou (he is a bellboy) and Gaston Lagaffe (he works in a publishing company and is the source of never ending disasters), whom he resembles physically. Franquin's shadow is even more obvious in the work of Ramón María Casanyes, a disciple and ghost collaborator of Ibáñez, especially in some of his solo works such as the short-lived "Tito, Homo Sapiens 2000", where the Franco-Belgian descent is unquestionable.

Awards and honors

 1972: Prix Saint-Michel, Belgium, for Gaston Lagaffe
 1974: First Grand Prix de la ville d'Angoulême, France
 1980: Adamson Award, Sweden
 1981: Prix Saint-Michel, Belgium, for Idées noires
 1987: Grand Prix for the Graphic Arts at the Angoulême International Comics Festival
 1991: Knight of the Order of Leopold, Belgium, for most than twenty years of career
 1996: Special Prize for outstanding life's work at the Max & Moritz Prizes in Erlangen, Germany
 2017: Asteroid 293985 Franquin, discovered by French amateur astronomer Bernard Christophe in 2007, was named in his memory. The official  was published by the Minor Planet Center on 12 March 2017.

Bibliography

Series

a.    The original collection. Some collections consist of four albums. The content is largely the same, however, where the gags have been spread out on thinner albums.
b.    The Special Edition series, published in chronological order by Dupuis and Marsu Productions in connection with the series' 40-year anniversary.
c.    Except for the first three main albums in the series, Franquin was also the creator of No. 0 Capturez un Marsupilami, a collection of earlier short stories with the character.
For Spirou et Fantasio, Modeste et Pompon, Isabelle and Marsupilami, several new albums were published by other artists after Franquin left the series.

One-shots
 Cauchemarrant (1979, published by Bédérama)
 Les robinsons du rail (1981, art by Franquin, text by Yvan Delporte; published by L'Atelier)
 Les démêlés d'Arnest Ringard et d'Augraphie (1981, art by Frédéric Jannin, text by Franquin and Yvan Delporte)
 L'Encyclopédie du Marsupilami (1991, illustrated faux encyclopedia about Marsupilami)
 Arnest Ringard et Augraphie (2006, art by Frédéric Jannin, text by Franquin and Yvan Delporte; redrawn and extended version of the above)
 Slowburn (1982, art by Franquin, text by Gotlib; published by Collectoropolis)
 Les Tifous (1990, published by Dessis)
 Le trombone illustré (2005, published by Marsu Productions)
 Un monstre par semaine (2005, published by Marsu Productions)
 Les noëls de Franquin (2006, art by Franquin, text by Yvan Delporte; published by Marsu Productions)

Sketchbooks
(published by Marsu Productions)
 Les doodles de Franquin
 Le bestiaire de Franquin
 Le bestiaire de Franquin tome 2
 Les monstres de Franquin
 Les monstres de Franquin tome 2
 Tronches à gogo
 Les signatures de Franquin

References 
 

 Franquin publications in Spirou BDoubliées

Further reading
 Jacky Goupil, Livre d'or Franquin: Gaston, Spirou et les autres...
 Numa Sadoul, Et Franquin créa la gaffe
 Philippe Vandooren, Franquin/Jijé
 Les cahiers de la BD #47-48
 Le monde de Franquin (exhibition catalog)
 Kris de Saeger, Dossier Franquin
 Achim Schnurrer and Jef Meert, Archief Franquin
 José-Louis Bocquet and Eric Verhoest, Franquin - Chronologie d'un œuvre
 Xavier Chimits and Pedro Inigo Yanez, Le garage de Franquin
 Yann and Olivier Schwartz, Gringos locos (biographical comic)

External links
Franquin official site 
Gaston Lagaffe official site 
Biography on Dupuis.com
Franquin biography on Lambiek Comiclopedia
SSZ: The World Around Franquin comics creators discuss Franquin 
 Le Monde de Franquin Expo, Franquin dossier pdf downloads 
 Original comic art from Franquin

1924 births
1997 deaths
People from Etterbeek
Spirou et Fantasio
Belgian comics artists
Belgian illustrators
Belgian satirists
Belgian humorists
Belgian activists
Grand Prix de la ville d'Angoulême winners